Jacques-Louis Potgieter (born 2 September 1984 in Pretoria) is a South African rugby union player, currently playing with French side . His regular position is fly-half.

Career

France
In January 2012, he signed for French Top 14 side Bayonne as a medical joker for the 2011–12 Top 14 season, then signed a one-year full-time contract for the 2012–13 Top 14 season.

Prior to the 2013–14 Rugby Pro D2 season, he joined Dax on a two-year deal, but gained an early release from this contract at the start of 2014.

Return to South Africa
He then returned to the  prior to the 2014 Super Rugby season on a two-year contract, which he then extended until October 2016.

Return to France

Potgieter left the Blue Bulls after the 2015 Super Rugby season, joining French Top 14 side . After two seasons at Lyon, he joined their compatriots  on a three-year deal.

Education
Potgieter attended Afrikaanse Hoër Seunskool (Afrikaans High School for Boys, also known as Affies), a public school located in Pretoria. He attended alongside former Bulls teammates Fourie du Preez, Wynand Olivier, Pierre Spies and Derick Kuun,  lock Adriaan Fondse, former Stade Français lock Cliff Milton and Titans cricketers AB de Villiers, Heino Kuhn and Faf du Plessis.

References

South African rugby union players
Living people
Afrikaner people
South African people of Dutch descent
1984 births
Rugby union players from Pretoria
Bulls (rugby union) players
Blue Bulls players
Cheetahs (rugby union) players
Free State Cheetahs players
Griffons (rugby union) players
Sharks (rugby union) players
Sharks (Currie Cup) players
Aviron Bayonnais players
Rugby union fly-halves
Expatriate rugby union players in France
South African expatriate sportspeople in France
South African expatriate rugby union players